The Sanjak of Klis was a sanjak of the Ottoman Empire which seat was in the Fortress of Klis in Klis (modern-day Croatia) till capture by Republic of Venice in 1648, latterly in Livno between 1648-1826.

Background 
The Sanjak of Klis was established on 12 March 1537, after Ottoman victory in the Siege of Klis. Klis was stronghold of Uskoks and thorn in both Venetian and Ottoman side. It was captured by Ottoman forces commanded by Murat Beg Tardić on behalf of Gazi Husrev-beg who was the sanjakbey of the Sanjak of Bosnia.

Administrative division 
The territory of the Sanjak of Klis was composed of the newly captured territories of western Bosnia, Dalmatia (with rivers Cetina, Krka and Zrmanja), Lika and Krbava. The Vilayet Croats was disestablished when it was annexed by the newly established Sanjak of Klis in 1537.

The first land survey of the Sanjak of Klis was done in 1540 within the survey of the Sanjak of Bosnia. The defter of 1550 is the oldest preserved defter of the Sanjak of Klis. This early 15th century defters show that the territory of this sanjak was depopulated. The Ottomans populated barren lands with fresh wave of herdsmen.

The Sanjak of Klis was part of the Bosnia Eyalet since it was established in 1580, as described by famous Ottoman traveler Evliya Çelebi.

Governors
Murat-beg Tardić was appointed as the first sanjakbey of the Sanjak of Klis. Tardić remained on that position until 1544 when he was appointed to position of the sanjakbey of the Sanjak of Požega. Malkoč-beg died in 1545 as sanjakbey of Klis. Sinan, a son of sultan's wife and  sanjakbey of the Sanjak of Klis, died in 1593 in a battle. In 1596 sanjakbey was Mustafa-pasha Pijade-pašić. In period 1609 — 1615 sanjakbey was Zulfikar-pasha Atlagić whose successor Piri-pasha killed him in 1616. In 1645 sanjakbey was Miralem who was Albanian. In 1648 sanjakbey was Mehmed Mustajbegović who lost Klis to Venetians.

References 

Sanjaks of the Ottoman Empire in Europe
Ottoman period in the history of Croatia
Ottoman period in the history of Bosnia and Herzegovina
1537 establishments in the Ottoman Empire
1826 disestablishments in the Ottoman Empire
States and territories established in 1537
States and territories disestablished in 1648
1826 disestablishments in Europe
16th century in Croatia
17th century in Croatia
16th century in Bosnia and Herzegovina
17th century in Bosnia and Herzegovina